The following are lists of animated feature films first released in the 2010s.

 List of animated feature films of 2010
 List of animated feature films of 2011
 List of animated feature films of 2012
 List of animated feature films of 2013
 List of animated feature films of 2014
 List of animated feature films of 2015
 List of animated feature films of 2016
 List of animated feature films of 2017
 List of animated feature films of 2018
 List of animated feature films of 2019

See also 
 List of highest-grossing animated films of the 2010s

References

2010s
Animated